The 1982–83 Soviet League Season was the 37th year of competition in the Soviet Championship League. CSKA Moscow won the championship, its 7th in a row and 26th overall.

Regular season

5th-8th place

Relegation

External links
Season on hockeystars.ru

1982–83 in Soviet ice hockey
Soviet League seasons
Sov